The First Somali Bank (FSB) is a bank headquartered in Mogadishu, Somalia.

Overview
FSB was established in May 2012 by Liban Abdi Egal. It is the first commercial bank to open in southern Somalia since 1991.

An Islamic financial institution, the bank offers personal banking, commercial banking, agency banking, mobile banking and internet banking. It also provides money transfer services to clients.

In mid-2012, the First Somali Bank organized its first ever Technology, Entertainment, Design (TEDx) conference. The event was launched to showcase improvements in local business, development and security to potential Somali and international investors.

Albert Falck was the first CEO of the bank from January 2012 to end of June 2012. He managed the product portfolio creation and launch of the bank.

See also

Central Bank of Somalia

Notes

External links
First Somali Bank
First Somali Bank Prospectus 2012

Banks of Somalia
Companies based in Mogadishu
2012 establishments in Somalia
Banks established in 2012